Frederick Windsor Warren (23 December 1907 – 1986) was a Welsh professional footballer and Wales international.

Club career

Warren began his career at his home town club Cardiff City, spending time as understudy to George McLachlan before becoming a more regular first team player. In January 1930, he was sold to Division One side Middlesbrough for a fee of £8,000, in a transfer that also involved Joe Hillier and Jack Jennings. After six years with Middlesbrough, Warren joined Heart of Midlothian, where he later became the club's first Welsh international. He remained at Tynecastle until the outbreak of World War II, returning to South Wales to work for Barry Town.

International career

Warren made his debut for Wales on 2 February 1929, scoring in a 2–1 win over Ireland in the 1929 British Home Championship. Four months later, during the summer of 1929 Warren was selected for the Football Association of Wales tour of Canada but these matches were not classed as international cap matches. His Cardiff City teammates Len Davies, Fred Keenor and Walter Robbins were also selected for the tour. During his career, he earned 6 caps for Wales over a period of nine years, scoring three times with all three being scored in matches against Ireland at the Racecourse Ground.

International goals
Results list Wales' goal tally first.

References

External links
London Hearts profile

1907 births
1986 deaths
Footballers from Cardiff
Welsh footballers
Wales international footballers
Cardiff City F.C. players
Middlesbrough F.C. players
Heart of Midlothian F.C. players
Barry Town United F.C. players
English Football League players
Scottish Football League players
Association football forwards